The 2016 Michigan Wolverines football team represented the University of Michigan in the sport of college football during the 2016 NCAA Division I FBS football season. The Wolverines played in the East Division of the Big Ten Conference and played their home games at Michigan Stadium in Ann Arbor, Michigan. Michigan was led by head coach Jim Harbaugh, who was in his second season.

Coming off the team's first 10-win season in four years in Jim Harbaugh's first season as head coach in 2015, Michigan began the year with high expectations, being ranked seventh in the preseason AP Poll. They won their three non-conference games in dominant fashion. In the following two games, the Wolverines obtained a top-10 victory over Wisconsin. Michigan continued to win, rising to number two in the College Football Playoff rankings at 9–0 before falling on the road to Iowa on a last-second field goal. Two weeks later, Michigan traveled to Columbus, Ohio to face arch-rival Ohio State with an opportunity to claim a spot in the 2016 Big Ten Football Championship Game with a win. The Wolverines lost in double overtime, 27–30, ending the regular season in third in the Eastern Division behind Ohio State and Penn State. Michigan received an invitation to the 2016 Orange Bowl, where they lost to Florida State, 32–33 to end the year at 10–3.

The team was led by unanimous first-team All-American linebacker Jabrill Peppers, who was the Big Ten Defensive Player of the Year and a finalist for the Heisman Trophy, finishing in fifth. Cornerback Jourdan Lewis was also a consensus first-team All-American, as was tight end Jake Butt, who was the recipient of the John Mackey Award as the nation's top tight end. Quarterback Wilton Speight led the team in passing, finishing with 2,538 yards and 18 touchdowns on the year.

Preseason
In 2015, Michigan compiled a 10–3 record (6–2 in conference play) during the regular season and played the Florida Gators in the Citrus Bowl, where Michigan defeated the Gators 41–7. This was Michigan's best record since the 2011 season, which saw Michigan finish with an 11–2 record and a Sugar Bowl victory over Virginia Tech.

Michigan suffered staff attrition when defensive coordinator D. J. Durkin left the program to become the head coach at Maryland. On December 21, 2015, Michigan officially announced the hiring of Don Brown as defensive coordinator. On January 7, 2016, it was officially announced that John Baxter would be leaving Michigan to become the Special Teams coach at USC. In response to both the Baxter and Durkin departures—Durkin had also coached linebackers for Michigan in addition to his position as defensive coordinator—Michigan promoted their recruiting coordinator Chris Partridge to Special Teams and Linebackers coach. On February 18, 2016, Greg Jackson left Michigan to become the defensive backs coach of the Dallas Cowboys. He was replaced by Brian Smith, who most recently served as an assistant linebackers coach with the Philadelphia Eagles under Chip Kelly.

The team conducted four of its spring practices at the IMG Academy in Bradenton, Florida between February 29 and March 4, 2016, which coincided with the University's annual spring break. The final practice was held as an open practice for fans and recruits, and saw an attendance of over 5,000 people. The practices were considered controversial, as coaches from the SEC and ACC protested what they believed to be an attempt to gain an upper hand in recruiting prospective athletes; however, at the time, no NCAA rules stated that the practices would not be allowed to take place. Michigan also conducted several satellite camps—football camps meant to expose prospective student athletes to colleges who might otherwise not find and recruit them due to distance or other factors—in 22 states, Australia, and American Samoa following the NCAA's reversal of a ban enacted only months prior.

Although agreed to many months earlier, in April, the University announced it had signed an 11-year, $127.12 million contract with Nike, Inc. on March 16 that would go into effect on August 1, 2016 for 31 Michigan Wolverines sports teams to switch from wearing Adidas apparel to Nike. The Wolverines became the first football program to wear the jumpman logo and every piece of football apparel donned by the team that is visible is Jordan Brand attire. Michigan unveiled its new uniforms and gear during a ceremony at the Ford Piquette Avenue Plant on August 2. Michigan alumna Dana Jacobson hosted the event, while former Wolverine great Charles Woodson was also in attendance.

Recruiting

Position key

Recruits

Michigan's recruiting class consisted of 28 recruits, including seven that enrolled early. Michigan's recruiting class was ranked No. 6 by Scout, No. 4 by Rivals, and No. 6 by ESPN. The highlight of the class was the consensus number one recruit in the country, Rashan Gary.

Schedule

Rankings

Entering the season, Michigan was ranked No. 7 in the AP Poll and No. 8 in the Coaches' Poll. Following its opening victory over Hawaii, Michigan rose to No. 5 in the AP Poll and No. 6 in the Coaches' Poll, and then rose to No. 4 in the AP Poll and No. 5 in the Coaches' Poll following its victory over UCF. Michigan held serve in the polls following its victories over Colorado and Penn State. Michigan rose to No. 4 in the Coaches' Poll following its victory over Wisconsin, and remained at No. 4 in both polls following its win over Rutgers. Michigan rose to No. 3 in the AP Poll during its bye week. Michigan rose to No. 2 in both polls following its victory over Michigan State and was ranked No. 3 in the season's first edition of the College Football Playoff (CFP) rankings. Following its loss to Iowa, Michigan fell to No. 4 in both polls, but remained at No. 3 in the CFP rankings. Michigan rose to No. 3 in the AP Poll following its victory over Indiana, and remained at No. 4 in the Coaches' Poll, and No. 3 in the CFP rankings.

Radio
Radio coverage for all games was broadcast statewide on The Michigan IMG Sports Network and on Sirius XM Satellite Radio. The radio announcers are Jim Brandstatter with play-by-play, Dan Dierdorf with color commentary, and Doug Karsch with sideline reports.

Game summaries

vs. Hawaii

Sources:

    
    
    
    
    
    
    
    
    

To open the season, Michigan hosted the Hawaii Rainbow Warriors. This was the first meeting between the teams since 1998, which saw Michigan defeat Hawaii 48–17.

Michigan won in a blowout, 63–3. Michigan opened the scoring in the first quarter via a 12-yard touchdown pass from Wilton Speight to Grant Perry and added to its lead with a 19-yard touchdown pass from Speight to Jake Butt. Michigan added 21 points in the second quarter via a five-yard touchdown pass from Speight to Amara Darboh, a Lano Hill 27-yard interception return for a touchdown (pick six), and an 18-yard touchdown run from freshman running back Chris Evans, which made the score 35–0 in favor of Michigan at half-time. Michigan extended its lead early in the third quarter with a 43-yard touchdown run from Evans, and then added fourteen more points via a Channing Stribling 51-yard interception return for a touchdown and a four-yard touchdown run from Khalid Hill. Hawaii reduced Michigan's lead to 53 with a 55-yard field goal from Rigoberto Sanchez, but Michigan ended the scoring with a five-yard touchdown run from Karan Higdon.

Michigan's honorary captain for the game was NBA Hall of Famer Michael Jordan, while former Wolverines Charles Woodson and Lamarr Woodley were also honored during the game. Michigan's 60-point margin of victory was the seventh highest margin of victory in program history and the highest since Michigan defeated Northwestern 69–0 in 1975. The game marked the fourth time in program history that Michigan did not punt during a game, and the first time since 2009 (against Delaware State). This was the first time Michigan had two pick sixes in a game since the 1999 Citrus Bowl against Arkansas and the first time since 2011 that it had two defensive touchdowns in one game. Thirty-three Wolverines made their collegiate debut, while seventeen true freshmen appeared in the game, setting a program record. Evans—appearing in his first college game—rushed for 112 yards and two touchdowns on eight carries. He became just the third Wolverine true freshman to surpass 100 rushing yards in his collegiate debut, joining Walter Cross (104 yards, September 12, 1998) and Chris Perry (103 yards, September 2, 2000).

vs. UCF

Sources:

    
    
    
    
    
    
    
    
    
    

Following its opening game against Hawaii, Michigan hosted the Central Florida (UCF) Knights. This was the first ever meeting between the two teams.

Michigan won in another lopsided victory, 51–14. Michigan opened the scoring in the first quarter via a three-yard touchdown pass from Speight to Butt, and added to its lead via a two-yard touchdown run from Hill and a 45-yard touchdown pass from Speight to Darboh. Michigan added 13 points in the second quarter via a 24-yard, and 36-yard field goal from Allen, and a 14-yard touchdown pass from Speight to Butt. UCF reduced Michigan's lead to 27 points via an 87-yard touchdown run from Adrian Killins, which made the score 34–7 in favor of Michigan at half-time. Michigan extended its lead in the third quarter via a one-yard touchdown run from Hill and a 37-yard field goal by Allen. UCF reduced Michigan's lead to 30 points via a 34-yard touchdown run from Dontravious Wilson. Michigan ended the scoring in the fourth quarter with a 30-yard touchdown pass from Speight to Darboh.

Michigan posted back-to-back 50-plus-point performances for the first time since 1992. Michigan combined for 114 total points in its first two games of the season, the most in program history in more than 100 years. Over his first two games, Speight has seven touchdown passes, tying him with John Navarre for the most touchdown passes in the first two games of a season by a Michigan quarterback. Butt had seven receptions with two touchdowns for the first multi-touchdown game of his career. Butt's seven receptions give him 100 for his career, moving him into third place for career receptions by a tight end.

vs. Colorado

Sources:

    
    
    
    
    
    
    
    
    
    

After playing UCF, Michigan hosted the Colorado Buffaloes. This was the first meeting between the schools since 1997, which saw Michigan win its opener en route to a national championship.

Michigan overcame a 14-point first quarter deficit and won the game 45–28. This was the 14th time that Michigan has overcome a deficit of 14 points or more to win. Colorado opened the scoring in the first quarter via a 37-yard touchdown pass from Sefo Liufau to Devin Ross and added to its lead via an 18-yard fumble recovery for a touchdown by Dere McCartney. Michigan responded with a six-yard blocked punt touchdown return by Grant Perry, which reduced Colorado's lead to seven points. Colorado regained its 14-point lead via a six-yard touchdown pass from Liufau to Devin Ross. Michigan responded with 17 unanswered points in the second quarter: a 17-yard touchdown run from Jehu Chesson, a 39-yard field goal by Kenny Allen, and a 45-yard touchdown pass from Speight to Darboh, which made the score 24–21 in favor of Michigan at half-time. Colorado regained the lead in the third quarter via a 70-yard touchdown pass from Liufau to Shay Fields; Liufau suffered an injury on the play and was replaced by Steven Montez for the remainder of the game. Michigan then regained the lead with a  42-yard touchdown run from De'Veon Smith. Michigan added to its lead with a one-yard touchdown run from Ty Isaac, and then ended the scoring in the fourth quarter with a 54-yard punt return for a touchdown from Jabrill Peppers.

Michigan's honorary captains for the game were former Michigan and current New England Patriots quarterback Tom Brady and Activision Blizzard CEO Robert Kotick. Michigan has combined for 159 total points over its first three games of the 2016 season, the most over that stretch in program history. Michigan scored two touchdowns off punts returns in a single game for just the second time in program history, and the first time since 1954. Jake Butt posted seven receptions for 87 yards and moved into third among Michigan's all-time leaders in receiving yards by a tight end with 1,292.

vs. Penn State

Sources:

    
    
    
    
    
    
    
    

Following its game against Colorado, Michigan began its Big Ten portion of the schedule when it hosted the Penn State Nittany Lions. Michigan defeated Penn State 28–16 in the previous meeting.

Michigan won in another blowout, 49–10. Michigan opened the scoring in the first quarter via a one-yard touchdown run from Khalid Hill, and a two-yard touchdown run from De'Veon Smith. Michigan added to its lead in the second quarter via a three-yard touchdown pass from Wilton Speight to Devin Asiasi, and a two-yard touchdown run from Karan Higdon, which made the score 28–0 in favor of Michigan at half-time. Penn State reduced Michigan's lead to 25 with a 21-yard field goal by Tyler Davis in the third quarter. Michigan responded with a three-yard touchdown run from Chris Evans. Penn State opened the scoring in the fourth quarter via an eight-yard pass from Trace McSorley to Chris Godwin. Michigan responded with a 40-yard touchdown run from Karan Higdon, before Ty Isaac added the final points of the game via a three-yard touchdown run.

Michigan's honorary captain for the game was alumnus Don Graham, the founder of Michigan's Graham Sustainability Institute. Michigan has combined for 208 total points over its first four games of the 2016 season, the most over that stretch in program history. Michigan has scored 40 or more points in each of its first four games for the first time since 1947. Michigan posted a season best six sacks, the most in a game since 2014 against Northwestern.

With the win, the Wolverines also retook the all time college football winning percentage from its rival Notre Dame.

vs. Wisconsin

Sources:

    
    

After facing Penn State, Michigan hosted the Wisconsin Badgers. Despite being in the same conference, these teams had not met since 2010, when Wisconsin defeated Michigan 48–28.

Michigan defeated Wisconsin in a defensive battle, 14–7. After neither team scored in the first quarter, Michigan opened the scoring in the second quarter via a one-yard touchdown run from Khalid Hill, which made the score 7–0 in favor of Michigan at half-time. Wisconsin responded in the third quarter with a 17-yard touchdown pass from Alex Hornibrook to Dare Ogunbowale. Michigan re-gained the lead and ended the scoring in the fourth quarter via a 46-yard touchdown pass from Speight to Darboh.

Michigan's honorary captain for the game was former faculty athletics representative, and current University of Michigan English professor Anne Curzan. The win was Michigan's first over a top-10 opponent since beating Wisconsin in 2008, 27–25, ending a streak of 12 consecutive such losses (including two under Harbaugh). Michigan was 0 for 3 on Field Goal attempts.

at Rutgers

Sources:

    
    
    
    
    
    
    
    
    
    

After its game against Wisconsin, Michigan traveled to New Jersey to face Rutgers in Michigan's first road game of the season. Michigan defeated Rutgers 49–16 in the previous meeting.

Michigan won in a historic blowout, 78–0. Michigan opened the scoring in the first quarter via a four-yard touchdown run from Ty Isaac. Michigan added to its lead via a 30-yard touchdown pass from Speight to Chesson. Michigan added 29 points in the second quarter via a seven-yard touchdown run from Peppers, two one-yard touchdown runs from Hill, a two-point conversion Garrett Moores rush, and a four-yard touchdown run from Peppers, which made the score 43–0 in favor of Michigan at half-time. Michigan added 14 points in the third quarter via an 11-yard touchdown pass from John O'Korn to Hill, and a 15-yard touchdown run from Karan Higdon. Michigan added 21 points in the fourth quarter via a 13-yard touchdown run from Bobby Henderson, a 44-yard touchdown run from Higdon, and a 34-yard touchdown run from Isaac.

The game was a statistical domination for Michigan. Michigan accumulated 600 yards of offense and eleven touchdowns (nine rushing, two passing); the nine rushing touchdowns tied for the most in modern program history. Khalid Hill recorded three touchdown scores, making him the first Michigan player with three or more scores since Chesson had four in 2015 against Indiana. Michigan improved to 6–0 for the first time since 2011 and recorded its first shutout since the previous season against Northwestern. Michigan's defense held Rutgers to only 39 total yards, two first downs, 14 three-and-outs and 0-for-17 on third down. Michigan recorded its largest margin of victory—during either conference or non-conference play—since it defeated Chicago 85–0 in 1939. This was also the largest margin of victory in any Big Ten game since the same Michigan victory over Chicago. The defeat was Rutgers' worst loss since an 82–0 loss to Princeton in 1888.

vs. Illinois

Sources:

    
    
    
    
    
    
    

Following its clash with Rutgers and its bye week, Michigan hosted the Illinois Fighting Illini for its homecoming game. This was the first meeting between the schools since 2012, which saw Michigan defeat Illinois 45–0.

Michigan won the game, 41–8. Michigan scored 21 points in the first quarter via a three-yard touchdown pass from Wilton Speight to Jake Butt, a 21-yard touchdown pass from Speight to Tyrone Wheatley Jr., and a one-yard touchdown run from Khalid Hill. Michigan added to its lead in the second with a four-yard touchdown run from De'Veon Smith, and a 23-yard field goal by Kenny Allen, which made the score 31–0 in favor of Michigan at half-time. Michigan added to its lead with a 27-yard field goal by Allen in the third quarter. Illinois responded in the fourth quarter with a 43-yard touchdown pass from Jeff George, Jr. to Malik Turner, and a two-point conversion pass from George to Zach Grant, before Michigan added the final points of the game via a 45-yard touchdown run from Karan Higdon.

Michigan's honorary captain for the game was MLB Hall of Famer Hank Aaron. Michigan improved to 7–0 for the first time since 2006. Jake Butt recorded his fourth touchdown of the season—the 11th of his career—to gain sole possession of second place on Michigan's list of career touchdowns by a tight end, four behind leader Jerame Tuman (15). Amara Darboh extended his streak of consecutive games with a catch to 27 and now holds sole possession of the sixth spot among Michigan leaders in the category. Michigan's defense held Illinois to 172 total yards, and without a passing yard in the first half. This was the fourth straight game that Michigan has held an opponent to less than 200 yards.

at Michigan State

Sources:

    
    
    
    
    
    
    
    
    
    

After its homecoming game against Illinois, Michigan traveled to East Lansing to face its in-state rival, the Michigan State Spartans, for the Paul Bunyan Trophy. Michigan State defeated Michigan 27–23 in the previous season after returning a fumbled snap for a touchdown with no time remaining in the game.

Michigan defeated Michigan State, 32–23, for its first win against the Spartans since 2012 and its first win at Spartan Stadium since 2007. Michigan State opened the scoring in the first quarter with a five-yard touchdown run from LJ Scott, which capped off an opening drive that lasted seven minutes and two seconds. Michigan responded with a three-yard touchdown run from Jabrill Peppers and then took the lead in the second quarter with a one-yard touchdown run from De'Veon Smith. Michigan State reduced Michigan's lead to four with a 52-yard field goal from Michael Geiger, but Kenny Allen answered with a 23-yard field goal for Michigan. Michigan scored twice in the final minute of the half with a five-yard touchdown run from Smith and another 23-yard field goal from Allen, which gave Michigan a 27–10 lead at half-time. Michigan extended its lead to 20 in the fourth quarter with a 45-yard field goal from Allen, and coasted from there. Michigan State reduced Michigan's lead to seven points with a 5-yard touchdown pass from Tyler O'Connor to Donnie Corley with :01 left on the clock. On an ensuing two-point conversion attempt, O'Connor fumbled the ball and Peppers returned it for a two-point conversion for Michigan to close out the game.

Michigan improved to 8–0 for the first time since 2006. Michigan's 5–0 record in Big Ten play is the best start to conference play for Michigan since its 6–0 start in 2007. With three receptions today, Jake Butt passed Jim Mandich (119 catches) for the second-most receptions by a tight end in Michigan history. Butt now has 121 career catches.

vs. Maryland

Sources:

    
    
    
    
    
    
    
    
    

After facing Michigan State, Michigan hosted the Maryland Terrapins. Maryland was led by Michigan's former defensive coordinator D. J. Durkin. In the 2015 contest, Michigan defeated Maryland, 28–0.

Michigan won in another blowout, 59–3. Michigan opened the scoring in the first quarter via a 34-yard touchdown pass from Speight to Darboh. Michigan added to its lead via a ten-yard touchdown run from Speight. Michigan added 21 points in the second quarter via a three-yard touchdown run from De'Veon Smith, a one-yard touchdown run from Khalid Hill and a 33-yard touchdown pass from Speight to Chesson, which made the score 35–0 in favor of Michigan at half-time. Michigan added 10 points in the third quarter via a 29-yard field goal from Kenny Allen, and a one-yard touchdown run from Smith. Maryland opened the scoring in the fourth quarter via a 37-yard field goal from Adam Greene, for their only points of the game. Michigan responded with 14 points via a two-yard touchdown run from Smith, his third rushing touchdown of the game, and a nine-yard touchdown pass from John O'Korn to Kekoa Crawford.

Michigan improved to 9–0 for the first time since 2006. Wilton Speight set a program record for the most passing yards in the first half with 292 yards. The previous record-holder was Denard Robinson, who had 262 vs. Illinois in 2010. This was the first game the Wolverine offense featured a 300-yard passer (Wilton Speight, 362), a 100-yard rusher (De'Veon Smith, 114) and a 100-yard receiver (Jehu Chesson, 112) since October 19, 2013, vs. Indiana. Jake Butt became the program's all-time leader for receiving yards from a tight end (1,521), surpassing the previous record set by Jim Mandich (1,508). Michigan's defense combined for 13 tackles-for loss, tying a season record.

at Iowa

Sources:

    
    
    
    
    
    

After hosting Maryland, Michigan traveled to Iowa City, Iowa to face the Iowa Hawkeyes. This was the first meeting between the two schools since Iowa defeated Michigan 24–21 in 2013.

Iowa upset Michigan, 13–14. Michigan opened the scoring in the first quarter via a 26-yard field goal from Kenny Allen. Michigan extended its lead in the second quarter via a seven-yard touchdown run from Ty Isaac. Iowa responded with a Jaleel Johnson safety and a three-yard touchdown pass from C. J. Beathard to Akrum Wadley, which made the score 10–8 in favor of Michigan at half-time. Iowa took their first lead of the game via a 25-yard field goal from Keith Duncan. Michigan responded with a 51-yard field goal from Allen, to regain the lead, before Duncan scored the game-winning 33-yard field goal as time expired.

Michigan's 37 rushing scores are the third most for the team since 1970, trailing only the 43 touchdowns scored by the 1976 team and the 47 scored by the 1971 team. The game was similar to the 1985 match-up between the two teams, when No. 1 ranked Iowa defeated No. 2 ranked Michigan, quarterbacked by now Michigan head coach Jim Harbaugh, on a game-winning field goal from Rob Houghtlin as time expired. After losses by No. 3 ranked Clemson, and No. 4 ranked Washington earlier in the day, and the loss by No. 2 ranked Michigan, this marked the first time since October 19, 1985 that Nos. 2–4 all lost on the same day. In the days following the game, it was erroneously reported by blogger Brian Cook of the "mgoblog" fan website that Speight had endured a broken collarbone during the game and may be lost for the rest of the season. However, he returned for the game against Ohio State.

vs. Indiana

Sources:

    
    
    
    
    

Following its game against Iowa, Michigan played its final home game against Indiana. Michigan defeated Indiana 48–41 in double overtime the previous season.

Michigan defeated Indiana, 20–10. After neither team scored in the first quarter, Michigan opened the scoring in the second quarter via a 28-yard field goal from Kenny Allen. Indiana responded with a two-yard touchdown run from Camion Patrick, which made the score 7–3 in favor of Indiana at half-time. Michigan reduced Indiana's lead to one point via a 33-yard field goal from Allen. Indiana extended its lead in the third quarter via a 24-yard field goal from Griffin Oakes. Michigan responded with 14 unanswered points via two touchdown runs from De'Veon Smith, one from 34-yards, and one from 39-yards.

Michigan improved to 10–1, achieving back-to-back double-digit win seasons for the first time since 2002–03. It is the 28th time in program history that Michigan reached 10 wins. Jim Harbaugh is one of only two coaches in program history to win 10 games in each of his first two seasons as head coach, joining Fielding Yost (1901–02). Senior quarterback John O'Korn made his first start since the 2014 season. With two pass breakups against the Hoosiers, cornerback Jourdan Lewis upped his career total to 43 to tie Leon Hall (2003–06) for the most in Michigan history.

at Ohio State

Sources:

    
    
    

    
    
    
    
    

Following its home finale against Indiana, Michigan faced its arch-rivals, the Ohio State Buckeyes, in the 113th meeting of "The Game". In the previous meeting, Ohio State defeated Michigan for the fourth consecutive year, winning 42–13.

Michigan lost to Ohio State 27–30 in double overtime. After neither team scored in the first quarter, Michigan opened the scoring in the second quarter via a 28-yard field goal from Kenny Allen. Ohio State responded with a 16-yard interception return from Malik Hooker. Michigan closed the scoring in the first half via a one-yard touchdown run from Khalid Hill, which made the score 10–7 in favor of Michigan at halftime. Michigan extended their lead in the third quarter via an eight-yard touchdown pass from Wilton Speight to Hill. Ohio State reduced Michigan's lead to three points via a one-yard touchdown run from Mike Weber, before Tyler Durbin recorded a 23-yard field goal as time expired in the fourth quarter to tie the game and force overtime. In overtime, Ohio State scored via a seven-yard touchdown run from J. T. Barrett. Michigan responded with a five-yard touchdown pass from Speight to Amara Darboh to force double overtime. In double overtime, Michigan scored via a 37-yard field goal from Allen, before Curtis Samuel recorded a 15-yard touchdown run to win the game, after J. T. Barrett was ruled to have converted a 4th down on the previous play. Whether Barrett’s 4th down play had been successful or not would be a major point of discussion following the game.

Dave Adolph served as honorary captain for both Michigan and Ohio State. The game marked the 11th time that Michigan and Ohio State took the field both in the nation's top-five rankings; and is just the second time that both programs were ranked in the nation's top three. The other was the No. 1 vs. No. 2 matchup in 2006 at Ohio Stadium. The game also marked the first overtime in the Michigan-Ohio State rivalry. Michigan's defense recorded a season-best eight sacks against Ohio State. It is the program's most since posting nine against Notre Dame on September 15, 2007. The Wolverines have recorded at least three sacks in each of the last four games. Wide receiver Amara Darboh surpassed the 2,000-yard receiving milestone in the contest. Darboh caught eight passes for 68 receiving yards, upping his career total to 2,026. Darboh has recorded a reception in 32 consecutive games, earning a share of the fourth spot among Michigan's all-time leaders in the category. He is tied with Marquise Walker (1998–2001).

The Big Ten fined Head Coach Jim Harbaugh and the school $10,000 for violating their sportsmanship policy after he was critical of the officiating crew at a post-game press conference.

Statistics

vs. Florida State

Sources:

    
    
    
    
    
    
    
    
    
    
    
    

On December 4, Michigan was selected to play in the Orange Bowl against the Florida State Seminoles. Michigan lost the previous meeting in 1991, by a score of 51–31. This was Michigan's 45th bowl game appearance, and third appearance in the Orange Bowl.

Playing without Heisman Trophy finalist Jabrill Peppers, Michigan lost to Florida State, 33–32. Florida State opened the scoring in the first quarter via a two-yard touchdown run from Dalvin Cook. Michigan responded with a 19-yard field goal from Kenny Allen. Florida State extended its lead with a 42-yard field goal from Roberto Aguayo and a 92-yard touchdown pass from Deondre Francois to Nyqwan Murray. The teams exchanged field goals in the second quarter, a 28-yard field goal from Allen, and a 38-yard field goal from Roberto Aguayo, which made the score 20–6 in favor of Florida State at half-time. Michigan scored nine points in the third quarter on a 37-yard field goal from Allen, and a 14-yard interception return from Mike McCray, reducing Florida State's lead to five points. Florida State extended its lead in the fourth quarter via a three-yard run from Francois. Michigan responded with 15 unanswered points via an eight-yard touchdown pass from Wilton Speight to Khalid Hill, and a 30-yard touchdown run from Chris Evans to take their first lead of the game. Florida State responded with a 12-yard touchdown pass from Francois to Murray. Florida State's extra point was blocked by Chris Wormley, and Josh Metellus returned it the length of the field for a defensive conversion, making the score 33–32 in favor of the Seminoles. Michigan took over possession at its 25-yard line following the kickoff but was unable to get anything going as a fourth-down pass was intercepted near midfield to seal the game.

Michigan finished the season with 534 points scored, fifth all-time trailing only the 1901–1904 point-a-minute teams. In finishing three-for-three on the day in field goals, Kenny Allen was one shy of the program record for most consecutive field goals made (16). Allen finished his career at 37-for-45, an 82.2-percent clip, just short of passing Bob Bergeron (29-of-35; 82.9 percent) as Michigan's all-time most accurate field goal kicker (minimum of 15 attempts). He also closes his career a perfect 95-for-95 on point-after attempts, tied with 10 others atop the program charts. Wide receiver Amara Darboh finished his career with at least one catch in 33 straight games, the fourth-longest streak in program history. Jeremy Gallon owns the record at 39 consecutive games.

2017 NFL Draft

Michigan set a program record with 11 NFL Draft selections, surpassing the previous record of 10, which was set in 1972 and 1974. Nine of this year's selections came in the first four rounds, setting another program record. It was also the most draftees in the 2017 NFL Draft by any school.

Roster

Awards and honors

References

External links

Michigan
Michigan Wolverines football seasons
Michigan Wolverines football